Franz Hübner(18 November 1846 Drossen, near Frankfurt an der Oder – 31 December 1877) was a German entomologist

Between 1875 and 1877 he collected insects for the Museum Godeffroy in Samoa, Tonga and New Britain.

References
Weidner, H. 1967 Geschichte der Entomologie in Hamburg. Abh. Verh. Naturwiss. Ver. Hamburg, N. F. 9(Suppl.) 5-387.

German entomologists
1846 births
1877 deaths